Mikhaylovsk is a town in Nizhneserginsky District of Sverdlovsk Oblast, Russia, located on the shores of Mikhaylovsky Pond,  southwest of Yekaterinburg, the administrative center of the oblast. Population:

History
It was founded in 1805 as Mikhaylovsky Zavod. It was granted town status and given its present name in 1961.

Administrative and municipal status
Within the framework of the administrative divisions, it is, together with one rural locality (the settlement of Mikhaylovsky Zavod), incorporated within Nizhneserginsky District as the Town of Mikhaylovsk. As a municipal division, the Town of Mikhaylovsk, together with ten rural localities in Nizhneserginsky District, is incorporated within Nizhneserginsky Municipal District as Mikhaylovskoye Urban Settlement.

References

Notes

Sources

Cities and towns in Sverdlovsk Oblast
Krasnoufimsky Uyezd